David Edward Heaton (born February 2, 1941) is the Iowa State Representative from the 91st District, representing all of Henry County and the northern portion of Lee County. He has served in the Iowa House of Representatives since January 1995.

Born and raised in Sigourney, Iowa, he received his B.A. in history in 1964 from Iowa Wesleyan College in Mount Pleasant, Iowa, where he currently resides. For 40 years, he and his family owned and operated a popular restaurant operation, The Iris, located in Mount Pleasant. He and his wife, Carmen, are the parents of two grown children and have two grandchildren.

Heaton currently serves on several committees in the Iowa House – the Appropriations committee; the Human Resources committee; and the Judiciary committee. He also serves as the ranking member on the Health and Human Services Appropriations Subcommittee.

Heaton was re-elected in 2006 with 6,726 votes, running unopposed. He has faced some  opposition since his first election in 1994, where he carried the district with nearly 70% of the popular vote. Heaton faced Ron Fedler, former small-town mayor and small business owner in 2008.

References

External links 
 Representative Dave Heaton official Iowa General Assembly site
 
Profile at Iowa House Republicans

|-

|-

Republican Party members of the Iowa House of Representatives
Living people
1941 births
People from Sigourney, Iowa
People from Mount Pleasant, Iowa
American restaurateurs
21st-century American politicians